Petar Rodić (born June 23, 1959) is a Serbian basketball coach.

Early life 
Rodić started to play basketball for OKK Dunav, the club where he was one of the founding members. In 1979, he retired due to injury. Rodić earned his degree in physical culture from the University of Novi Sad.

Coaching career 
In 1979, Rodić became head coach for Dunav. In 1985, he sign for KK Lifam, based in Stara Pazova. In 1986, Rodić joined the Partizan coaching staff as an assistant coach. He won Yugoslav League championship in the 1986–87 season. In the late-1980s and during 1990s, Rodić had coaching stints in Mladost Zemun, Lifam, Užice, Raj banka Berane, Klik Arilje and Radnički Zastava.

Rodić coached the Yugoslavia cadet team that won the gold medal at the 1999 European Championship for Cadets. Two years later, he was an assistant coach for the Yugoslavia university team that won the gold medal at the 2001 Summer Universiade in Beijing, China. In 2007, he became the head coach for Bosnian team Leotar Trebinje. In 2011, Rodić joined the Khimik coaching staff as an assistant coach.

References

External links
 Coach Profile at eurobasket.com

1959 births
Living people
Basketball players from Belgrade
KK Lifam coaches
KK Leotar coaches
KK Mladost Zemun coaches
KK Klik Arilje coaches
KK Radnički Kragujevac (1950–2004) coaches
KK Sloboda Užice coaches
OKK Dunav players
OKK Dunav coaches
Serbian men's basketball coaches
Serbian expatriate basketball people in Bosnia and Herzegovina
Serbian expatriate basketball people in China
Serbian expatriate basketball people in Montenegro
Serbian expatriate basketball people in Ukraine
University of Novi Sad alumni
Yugoslav men's basketball players
Yugoslav basketball coaches